Ethiopia competed at the 2019 African Games held from 19 to 31 August 2019 in Rabat, Morocco. In total, athletes representing Ethiopia won six gold medals, five silver medals and 12 bronze medals and the country finished 9th in the medal table.

Medal summary

Medal table 

|  style="text-align:left; width:78%; vertical-align:top;"|

|  style="text-align:left; width:22%; vertical-align:top;"|

Athletics 

Ethiopia competed in athletics: the country won five gold medals, five silver medals and eight bronze medals and the country finished 3rd in the athletics medal table.

Men 

In the men's 10,000 metres event Berehanu Tsegu won the gold medal and Jemal Yimer won the bronze medal.

In the men's 3000 metres steeplechase the silver medal was won by Getnet Wale.

In the men's 20 kilometres walk the silver medal was won by Yohanis Algaw.

Women 

In the women's 800 metres event Hirut Meshesha won the gold medal.

In the women's 1500 metres event Lemlem Hailu won the bronze medal.

In the women's 5000 metres both the silver and bronze medals were won by athletes representing Ethiopia: Hawi Feysa won the silver medal and Alemitu Tariku won the bronze medal. Ejgayehu Taye also competed in this event and finished in 5th place.

In the women's 10,000 metres all medals were won by athletes representing Ethiopia: Tsehay Gemechu, Zeineba Yimer and Dera Dida won the gold, silver and bronze medals respectively.

In the women's 3000 metres steeplechase the gold medal was won by Mekides Abebe and the bronze medal was won by Weynshet Ansa. Birtukan Admu also competed in this event and finished in 4th place.

In the women's 20 kilometres walk the bronze medal was won by Yehualeye Beletew.

In the women's half marathon the medals were all won by athletes representing Ethiopia: Yalemzerf Yehualaw, Degitu Azimeraw and Meseret Belete won the gold, silver and bronze medals respectively. Yalemzerf Yehualaw also set a new African Games record in this event of 1:10:26.

In the women's high jump event the bronze medal was won by Ariyat Dibow.

Badminton 

Ethiopia competed in badminton with six players.

Boxing 

Ethiopia competed in boxing.

Dawit Wibshet won the bronze medal in the men's flyweight (52kg) event.

Chess 

Habtamu Ashenafi Gole, Leykun Mesfin Sisay, Ruth Leykun Eshete and Lidet Abate Haile are scheduled to compete in chess.

Cycling 

Ethiopia competed in cycling.

Tsega Gebre Beyene, Mhiret Gebreyewhans, Selam Amha and Eyerusalem Reda won the bronze medal in the women's road team time trial.

Gymnastics 

Ethiopia competed in gymnastics.

Karate 

Ethiopia competed in karate.

Swimming 

No medals were won by swimmers representing Ethiopia at the 2019 African Games.

Table tennis 

No medals were won by table tennis players representing Ethiopia at the 2019 African Games.

Taekwondo 

Ethiopia competed in Taekwondo. Tariku Girma Demisu won the gold medal in the men's -63 kg event.

Solomon Tufa Demse won the bronze medal in the men's -54 kg event and Tsebaot Gosaye Fikadu won the bronze medal in the Women's -53 kg event.

Nardos Chifra competed in the women's -49 kg event without winning a medal.

Tennis 

Ethiopia competed in several events in tennis.

References 

Nations at the 2019 African Games
2019
African Games